John Peter McGuire (born 14 July 1954) is a former Australian rules football player and cricketer. He is of Aboriginal descent.

Biography
McGuire attended Guildford Grammar School between 1970 and 1972. He and his wife Karen share a son and a daughter.

Cricket
McGuire played most of his career for Mount Lawley District Cricket Club in Western Australian Grade Cricket and is second in the all-time runscoring list for the first grade competition, scoring 10,004 runs. He also holds several club records, including the most career runs (9204) and the most career catches (160).

In January 1988 he captained a team of Aboriginal players who played a Prime Minister's XI personally captained by Bob Hawke. The team later in the year toured England to mark the Australian Bicentenary.

Australian rules football
McGuire played 85 games for East Perth Football Club in the West Australian Football League, including the 1978 premiership-winning team.

He then transferred to the Perth Football Club in 1980.

References

Living people
1954 births
East Perth Football Club players
Indigenous Australian players of Australian rules football
People educated at Guildford Grammar School
Indigenous Australian cricketers
Cricketers from Western Australia
Australian rules footballers from Western Australia